Antazoline is a 1st generation antihistamine with anticholinergic properties used to relieve nasal congestion and in eye drops, usually in combination with naphazoline, to relieve the symptoms of allergic conjunctivitis. To treat allergic conjunctivitis, antazoline can be combined in a solution with tetryzoline. The drug is a Histamine H1 receptor antagonist: selectively binding to but not activating the receptor, thereby blocking the actions of endogenous histamine and subsequently leading to the temporary relief of the negative symptoms brought on by histamine.

A large study on people 65 years old or older linked the development of Alzheimer's disease and other forms of dementia to the "higher cumulative" use of first-generation antihistamines, due to their anticholinergic properties.

References 

H1 receptor antagonists
Imidazolines